The Coudenhove-Kalergi family is a Bohemian noble family of mixed Flemish and Cretan Greek descent, which was formed after Count Franz Karl von Coudenhove (1825–1893) married Marie Kalergi (1840–1877). The Coudenhoves were counts of the Holy Roman Empire since 1790 and were prominent in the Habsburg Netherlands. After the upheaval of the French Revolution, they moved to Austria. The Kallergis family had enjoyed high status in Crete, having been sent there by Byzantine emperor Alexios II Komnenos in the mid-12th century. They remained there during the Venetian occupation (1204–1669) and subsequently moved to the Venetian-held Ionian Islands. Their palazzo in Venice is still standing.

History 
The Coudenhove family dates back to the Duchy of Brabant nobleman and crusader Gerolf I de Coudenhove (died 1259) and after it fought for the Habsburgs in the Dutch Revolt, the family moved to Flanders before the Habsburgs and Coudenhoves left after the Austrian Netherlands (Belgium) was taken by the Revolutionary French Republic.

The Kallergis family is a Cretan Greek noble family originating from the 11th or 12th century, which claims descent from the Byzantine Emperor Nikephoros II Phokas. During the Venetian rule over Crete, the Kallergis family was one of the most important Greek Orthodox families on the island. Richard von Coudenhove-Kalergi describes in his book  An idea conquers the world  the Kallergis name is composed of the Greek word kalon (=beautiful) and ergon (from ergō="work, task, deed, accomplishment, or purpose") [Greek: Καλλ(ι)έργης > Καλλέργης, known in many versions as Kalergis, Calergis, Kallergi, Callergi, Calergi].

The two families united when, on 27 June 1857 in Paris, Count Franz Karl von Coudenhove (1825–1893) married Marie Kalergi, only daughter of Polish pianist Maria Nesselrode and her husband, Jan Kalergis. The lands thus combined included the Zamato estate in the Carinthian mountains, the castle of Ottensheim in Upper Austria, and the Ronsperg estate and castle in western Bohemia.

Franz and Marie had six children, including Heinrich, the first count to use the double-barrelled name. In 1917 when Heinrich's eldest son, Johannes Evangelist Virgilio Coudenhove-Kalergi, was 24 years old, he asked Emperor Charles I of Austria to give him the title Coudenhove-Kalergi of Ronspergheim (von Ronspergheim), and the Emperor granted this request.

Family members 

 Count Heinrich von Coudenhove-Kalergi (1859–1906), who married Mitsuko Aoyama and had:
 Johannes Evangelist Virgilio Coudenhove-Kalergi von Ronspergheim (1893–1965), author of the cannibalism novel Ich fraß die weiße Chinesin (I ate the white Chinese) by the pen name Duca di Centigloria.
  Marie-Electa Thekla Elisabeth Christine Helene Sophie "Marina" Coudenhove-Kalergi von Ronspergheim (1927–2000), daughter of Johannes and his first wife Lilly. Married in Phoenix, Arizona in 1954. Died in Los Angeles in 2000.
 Count Richard Nikolaus von Coudenhove-Kalergi (1894–1972), Austrian writer, politician and founder of the International Paneuropean Union
 Gerolf Coudenhove-Kalergi / Count Gerolf von Coudenhove-Kalergi (1896–1978)
 Hans-Heinrich Richard Gerolf Karl Urban Maria Omnes Sancti Coudenhove-Kalergi (born 1926)
 Sophia Bowie Marie Coudenhove-Kalergi (born 1970)
  Dominik Cornelius Valentin Gerolf Eugene Coudenhove-Kalergi (born 1973), in 2009 he married Vincenz Liechtenstein's daughter Princess Adelheid Marie Beatrice Zita (born 1981).
 Xenia Marie Cornelia Hélène Zita Anna Therese Hildegard Omnes Sancti Coudenhove-Kalergi (born 2011)
 Tatiana Maria Mitsuko Benedikta Zita Sophie Ferdinandine Gisela Omnes Sancti Coudenhove-Kalergi (born 2013)
  Olympia Marie Gladys Zita Barbara Mauricette Elena Omnes Sancti Coudenhove-Kalergi (born 2016)
 Karl Jakob Maria Coudenhove-Kalergi (born 1928)
 Barbara Coudenhove-Kalergi (born 1932), Czech-Austrian journalist, Gerold's daughter
  Michael Coudenhove-Kalergi (born 1937), painter
 Elisabeth Maria Anna Coudenhove-Kalergi (1898–1936), secretary of Engelbert Dollfuss
 Olga Marietta Henriette Maria Coudenhove-Kalergi (1900–1976)
 Ida Friederike Görres (1901–1971), sixth child of Heinrich von Coudenhove-Kalergi, Catholic author
  Karl Heinrich Franz Maria Coudenhove-Kalergi (1903–1987)

Ancestors

Coudenhove family 
 Franz Ludwig von Coudenhove (1783−1851), adjutant of Archduke Charles army
 Maximilian von Coudenhove (1805−1889), Austrian feldmarschallleutnant
 Franz Karl von Coudenhove (1825–1893), father of Heinrich von Coudenhove-Kalergi (1859–1906)
 Max von Coudenhove / Max Julius Viktor Maria von Coudenhove (1865–1928), Austrian diplomat

Kalergis family 
 Dimitrios Kallergis (1803–1867), foreign minister of Greece, minister of military affairs of Greece
 Maria Nesselrode (1822–1874), pianist and patronne having a relationship with many famous people: Heine, Balzac, Chateaubriand, Musset, Mérimée, Delacroix, Richard Wagner, Liszt, Chopin; wife of Jan Kalergis
 Marie Kalergi (1840–1877), mother of Heinrich von Coudenhove-Kalergi (1859–1906)

References

External links 

 Sothebys auction
 Coudenhove genealogy